The Sphecinae is a subfamily of the digger wasp family Sphecidae.

It contains the following genera:

 Chilosphex Menke in R. Bohart and Menke, 1976
 Isodontia Patton, 1880
 Palmodes Kohl, 1890
 Prionyx Vander Linden, 1827
 Sphex Linnaeus, 1758
 Stangeella Menke, 1962

References

Sphecidae
Apocrita subfamilies